María Angélica Ramírez Luna (born 21 August 1975) is a Mexican politician affiliated with the National Action Party. As of 2014 she served as Deputy of the LIX Legislature of the Mexican Congress representing Puebla.

References

1975 births
Living people
People from Puebla (city)
Women members of the Chamber of Deputies (Mexico)
National Action Party (Mexico) politicians
Politicians from Puebla
Universidad Popular Autónoma del Estado de Puebla alumni
21st-century Mexican politicians
21st-century Mexican women politicians
Deputies of the LIX Legislature of Mexico
Members of the Chamber of Deputies (Mexico) for Puebla